The first world record in the men's pole vault was recognized by the International Association of Athletics Federations in 1912.

As of June 21, 2009, 71 world records have been ratified by the IAAF (now World Athletics) in the event. Since 2000, World Athletics makes no distinction between indoor and outdoor settings when establishing pole vault world records. This new rule was not applied retroactively. The introduction in the early 1950s of flexible vaulting poles made from composites such as fiberglass or carbon fiber allowed vaulters to achieve greater height.

Record progression

See also 
 Men's pole vault indoor world record progression
 Women's pole vault world record progression
 List of pole vaulters who reached 6 metres

References

External links 
 athletix.org data
 IOC data
 About

Pole vault, men
World record men
Pole vault, men
World record pole vault